Mission Kashmir is a 2000 Indian Hindi-language action thriller film directed and produced by Vidhu Vinod Chopra. The film stars Sanjay Dutt, Hrithik Roshan, Jackie Shroff, Preity Zinta, and Sonali Kulkarni. It deals with terrorism and the tragedy of children suffering from war.

Mission Kashmir follows a young boy Altaaf Khan, who gets adopted by a police chief as his police team accidentally kills Altaaf's entire family. After finding out, he seeks revenge and becomes a terrorist. Rated R in the United States due to violence, the film was screened at the Stockholm International Film Festival and released theatrically in India and worldwide on 27 October 2000 during the Diwali festival.

The film clashed with Aditya Chopra's musical romance Mohabbatein which starred Shah Rukh Khan and Amitabh Bachchan. It won the Filmfare Award for Best Action and had similarities with Roshan's another 2000 film Fiza, in which he also played a terrorist.

Plot

Inayat Khan is the Senior Superintendent of Police of Srinagar, Kashmir. When Inayat's young son Irfaan succumbs to his injuries he sustained from an accident following doctors' refusal to treat him in fear due to the fatwa instigated by wanted terrorist Malik Ul Khan forbidding doctors to treat policemen and their families, Inayat swears revenge against Malik. Inayat and his team manage to track down Malik and his men, but in the crossfire that ensues, a bystander couple is killed along with Malik and his men, leaving their son Altaaf as the sole survivor. Inayat's wife Neelima still grieving from the loss of her son and wrongly blaming herself for his death despite her husband's faith in her, convinces a reluctant Inayat to adopt the young Altaaf, who's traumatized from the loss of his family. Inayat fears Altaaf might seek vengeance if he learns the truth behind the event, and this fear comes true one day. After an unsuccessful attempt on Inayat's life, the young Altaaf runs away and is found and brought up by a terrorist group led by their Pathan leader Hilal Kohistani, who brainwashes him into thinking that he and his men act according to Islamic principles and trains him to become a terrorist.

Ten years later, Hilal is assigned the task of completing "Mission Kashmir," a plan of an unnamed terrorist sponsor that involves; or so Altaaf is told, killing the Indian Prime Minister. Hilal uses Altaaf's hatred as a means to achieve his own goals while encouraging the latter to target Inayat, who is now an Inspector General, for his family's death. Altaaf visits his childhood friend and television personality Sufiya Parvez and, though he falls in love with her, uses her to try and make Hilal's plan of blowing up the local TV tower of Srinagar on Khan's birthday successful. He makes another unsuccessful attempt on Inayat's life, which results in him being branded as a wanted criminal by the media and a fallout between Inayat and Neelima.

Sufiya also learns of Altaaf's true occupation and breaks off her relationship with him. On the same date that Atlaaf's family was murdered, Altaaf makes another attempt on Inayat by having three of Hilal's men plant a bomb in Khan's briefcase. Unfortunately, Neelima falls victim to it by accident, much to the complete devastation of both Inayat and Altaaf, with the former having lost his chance to apologize for his argument with her and the latter being wracked with extreme remorse for killing her.

Following Neelima's funeral, Inayat manages to invade one of the terrorists' hideouts and discovers evidence and information about Mission Kashmir after capturing the men who planted the bomb. After going through some cassette tapes with the help of Sufiya, Inayat learns that the true 'Mission Kashmir' is to launch missiles on local places of Hindu and Muslim worship to escalate Hindu-Muslim conflict across the subcontinent, thereby dividing Kashmir and turning it into a war zone. It also turns out that the attack on the TV tower was planned by Hilal to spread the rumor of assassinating the Prime Minister to cover up the true plot. Inayat also learns that Hilal deliberately kept the true plot of Mission Kashmir a secret from Altaaf for he fears that Altaaf would not support it. This is made evident when Atlaaf leaves to the swampy hideouts to prepare for the launches, Hilal secretly tells one of his men to keep an eye on Atlaaf and kill him if he doesn't consent over the true targets.

By staging a fire in the jail that allows one of the bomb-briefcase men to escape, Inayat and his men manage to track down and capture Hilal. Inayat offers to make a deal with Hilal: going under the false pretense of allowing Hilal and his men to continue forward with Mission Kashmir in exchange for killing Altaaf to avenge Neelima's death. Seeing that Inayat's 'hatred' of Altaaf is worthy of a Pathan's duty, Hilal accepts the deal, and to ensure no other mistake will be made, Inayat goes alone with Hilal to the hideouts.

As Hilal and Inayat reach the hideouts, Hilal tells Altaaf of Inayat's whereabouts. An enraged Altaaf starts beating up a weary Inayat, but the latter reveals to him the true goals of Mission Kashmir, stating that Kashmir will be turned into hell if he lets Hilal destroy the holy shrines. Hilal orders Altaaf to shoot Inayat, who is willing to accept his fate after expressing his dear love for Altaaf and remorse for killing his family.

As Altaaf struggles to do it, he remembers that Neelima took him to the shrines and the comment Neelima said about choosing sides during her visit earlier. Unwilling to betray his mother, Atlaaf decides to put his plan of revenge aside and aids Inayat in stopping Hilal and his men from targeting the holy shrines. However, Hilal throws a bomb to distract them before getting shot to death by Altaaf, giving Hilal's men a chance to prepare to blow up the shrines.

While Inayat shoots down several terrorists, Altaaf redeems himself by taking possession of a missile launcher and using it to destroy the other launchers and kill the remaining terrorists, thus saving the shrines. However, Altaaf gets shot in the torso and falls into the swamps. Inayat jumps in and rescues the unconscious Altaaf by bringing him to shore, evading the explosion of the hideouts caused by Altaaf's act of redemption.

The plans of Mission Kashmir are revealed to the public by the media, and the terrorist sponsor's hideout is found by Kashmiri police, who shoot the sponsor as he tries to get away after killing two of his associates. Altaaf wakes up from a pleasant dream, where he reconciles with Sufiya and forgives Inayat, accepting the latter as his father again after 10 years.

Cast 
 Sanjay Dutt as Inayat Khan
 Hrithik Roshan as Altaaf Khan
 Preity Zinta as Sufiya Parvez
 Sonali Kulkarni as Neelima Khan
 Jackie Shroff as Hilal Kohistani 
 Puru Raaj Kumar as Malik Ul Khan
 Abhay Chopra as Avinash Mattoo
 Vineet Sharma as Gurdeep Singh
 Rajendra Gupta as Chief Secretary 
 Ashok Banthia as Sharafat
 Mohsin Memon as Young Altaaf
 Heenaa Biswas as Young Sufi
 Yogin Soni as Irfaan
 Rohit Dua as Guru
 Suchita Trivedi as Dr Akhtar's wife
 Ram Awana as Zuber Bhai
 Papa Pencho as Himself
 Manoj Mishra as Koisha

Production
Due to the tight security in Kashmir, in late 1999, when the lead actor Hrithik Roshan arrived on location to start shooting Mission Kashmir, his debut film Kaho Naa... Pyaar Hai (2000) had not yet released, so no one recognized his face. Arriving for the first day of the shoot in Srinagar dressed as a Kashmiri militant, which he portrays in the film, the security guards on location thought Hrithik really was Kashmiri – because of his fair skin and light coloring, and refused to allow him on set. Shortly thereafter, on 14 January 2000, Kaho Naa... Pyaar Hai turned him a superstar overnight, and his face was instantly recognized everywhere.

Critical reception
Saisuresh Sivaswamy from Rediff wrote, "This is a story from the director's heart, not his head, and the sincerity comes across in frame after frame." Giving the film 4 out of 5 stars, N. K. Deoshi of apunkachoice.com wrote, "Beneath all the drama that goes on in the movie there lurks the aspiration to get across to people the message of what actually people of Kashmir are going through." Savitha Padmanabhan of The Hindu stated, "Mission Kashmir might have its faults but it is definitely a cut above the rest of the commercial Hindi films that have been made on terrorism." She also praised the cast's performances and the film's production value. Film journal Screen praised the performances, but further wrote, "Chopra makes a sincere effort in his latest film Mission Kashmir to bring to the fore, the turmoil in the valley. But one feels disappointed, all the same, that there is very little of Kashmiriyat in the story, which is more of a personal conflict between the victim of a police shoot-out and a police officer." Suman Tarafdar of Filmfare panned the film for its lack of "serious look at the issue". Vinayak Chakravorty of Hindustan Times, however, rated the film 3.5 stars, calling it "a good show" and praising Dutt's performance as "perfect". Jitendra Kothari of India Today praised the film as "a gripping film on a trenchantly topical issue, avoiding apportioning blame by intermingling strains of loss and guilt."

Awards and nominations

Music 

The soundtrack of the film contains seven songs. The music is conducted by the trio Shankar–Ehsaan–Loy, performing separately. Ehsaan Noorani composed three songs, while Shankar Mahadevan and Loy Mendonsa composed two songs each.

According to the Indian trade website Box Office India, with around 1.5million units sold, the film's soundtrack album was the year's third highest-selling. The song "Bumbro" was recreated as "Bumbro" for the film Notebook (2019).

References

External links

2000 films
2000s Hindi-language films
Films about terrorism in India
2000s action war films
Films shot in Jammu and Kashmir
Films directed by Vidhu Vinod Chopra
Films set in Jammu and Kashmir
Indian films about revenge
Indian Army in films
Kashmir conflict in films
Indian action war films